Black Future is the first full-length album recorded by technical thrash metal band Vektor, released in 2009 on Heavy Artillery records with a special edition double vinyl LP release in 2010. Earache Records reissued the album in 2013.

Track listing

Personnel
All information taken from CD booklet liner notes.

Vektor 

David DiSanto – guitar, vocals
Erik Nelson – guitar
Frank Chin – bass guitar
Blake Anderson – drums

Production 

 Byron Filson - Recorded, Engineered, Mixed, and Mastered
 Kian Ahmad - Cover Artwork
 Valerie Littlejohn - Live and Promotional Pictures

References 

2009 debut albums
Vektor (band) albums
Earache Records albums